Gianpetro Zappa (11 February 1955 – 8 May 2005) was a Swiss football defender.

References

1955 births
2005 deaths
Swiss men's footballers
FC Lugano players
FC Zürich players
FC Lausanne-Sport players
Swiss Super League players
Association football defenders
Switzerland under-21 international footballers
Switzerland international footballers
FC Chiasso managers
Swiss football managers
Sportspeople from Lausanne